This is a list of years in Nicaragua. See also the history of Nicaragua and timeline of Managua.  For only articles about years in Nicaragua that have been written, see :Category:Years in Nicaragua.

Twenty-first century

Twentieth century

Nineteenth century

See also 

 List of years

 
Nicaragua history-related lists
History of Nicaragua